"Goodbye Cruel World" is a song by Pink Floyd. It appears on their 1979 double album, The Wall.

Composition
A quiet song, the Prophet-5 analog synthesiser provides the D major chord sequence: D, G, D, A, D, while the bass guitar plays the root notes and their octaves. A similar bass riff was used in the earlier Pink Floyd songs "Careful with That Axe, Eugene" and the fade-out of "See Emily Play".

Plot
As with all tracks on The Wall, "Goodbye Cruel World" relates to the listener a segment of Pink's (the album's protagonist) story. More specifically, this song expresses Pink's recognition of the completion of his mental wall, and acknowledgement of his thorough isolation from society.

Live versions
In all performances of The Wall, both by Pink Floyd and in Roger Waters' solo career, the song represents the end of the first half of the show. The wall is built, apart from one brick. Waters appears in this small gap and as he sings the final word, "goodbye", the last brick is put into place, ending the first half of the show.

Personnel
 Roger Waters – bass guitar, vocals
 Richard Wright – Prophet-5 synthesizer, organ

Personnel per Fitch and Mahon.

Cover versions

Anathema covered the song for the re-release of their album, Alternative 4.
Korn's cover of "Another Brick in the Wall" on their album Greatest Hits Volume 1 includes this song at the end.
Noel Gallagher of Oasis covered the song in 1995 as a guest of an American radio station.
Musician Orlando Francisco Garcia performs an acoustic version of this song.

References
Fitch, Vernon. The Pink Floyd Encyclopedia (3rd edition), 2005. 
Pink Floyd: The Wall (1980 Pink Floyd Music Publishers Ltd., London, England,  [USA ]) for "Goodbye Cruel World"
Pink Floyd: Anthology songbook (1980 Warner Bros. Publications, Inc., Secaucus N.J.) for "See Emily Play"

Notes

Pink Floyd songs
1979 songs
Songs written by Roger Waters
Song recordings produced by Bob Ezrin
Song recordings produced by David Gilmour
Song recordings produced by Roger Waters
Songs about loneliness
Songs about suicide